The Kurmanji Kurdish Wikipedia is the Kurmanji Kurdish version of Wikipedia.
It was founded in January 2004.

See also 
 Kurdish Wikipedia
 Sorani Kurdish Wikipedia

References

External links 

Kurdish (Kurmanji)
 Kurmanji Kurdish Wikipedia
 Kurmanji Kurdish Wikipedia mobile version

Kurdish-language encyclopedias
Kurdish-language websites
Wikipedias by language
Internet properties established in 2004